John Robert Campbell Robinson (born 29 August 1971) is a Welsh former professional footballer who played as a midfielder. He made over 400 appearances during his professional career with Brighton & Hove Albion, Charlton Athletic, Cardiff City and Gillingham and also won 30 caps for Wales.

Early life
Robinson was born in Bulawayo, Rhodesia (now Zimbabwe) to a Glasgow-born father and Rhodesian mother. His father's job later moved the family to Durban in South Africa before they settled in Sussex in order for Robinson to pursue his dream of playing professional football.

Club career
After attending the Bobby Charlton Soccer School, Robinson began his professional career at Brighton & Hove Albion, signing his first deal with the club in 1987. In 1992, he moved to Charlton Athletic for £75,000; he would spend the bulk of his career with the south-east London club. In eleven years at Charlton, he helped the Addicks to two promotions and also enjoyed three seasons of Premier League football. He played in their dramatic win over Sunderland in the 1998 play-off final, winning 7–6 on penalties after a 4–4 draw, with Robinson himself scoring one of the penalties.

Robinson was released at the end of the 2002–03 season and joined Cardiff City following their promotion to Division One, making his debut on the opening day of the 2003–04 season in a 0–0 draw with Rotherham United. In October 2004, Robinson decided to leave Cardiff to sign for Gillingham to be closer to his mother, who was suffering from illness, and family. However, he retired after making just four appearances for the club after becoming disillusioned with professional football, stating "I haven't fallen out of love with playing football, it's the politics of football and becoming a commodity I don't like." He later had short spells with non-league sides Crawley Town and Lewes before retiring.

International career
After winning 16 caps for the Wales U21 side, Robinson made his debut for the senior team in a match against Albania in 1995. He played 30 games and scored three goals for the senior team before announcing his retirement in 2002.

Born in Rhodesia, Robinson qualified to play for Wales by being a British passport holder – a route to qualification that had been removed by the time he retired from international football.

After retirement
After leaving football, Robinson set up a property business with former Cardiff teammate Martyn Margetson and also runs his own football training school.
In 2008, he managed Canterbury School (Ft. Myers, FL) to an unbeaten 15-0-2 season in his first year at the school. On 21 May 2013 Robinson was named the head coach of the SW Florida Adrenaline of the USL Premier Development League. In 2017 he was elected to the Charlton Athletic Hall of Fame.

Honours
Individual
Welsh Footballer of the Year: 2000
PFA Team of the Year: 1997–98 First Division, 1999–2000 First Division

References

External links

John Robinson Soccer

Living people
1971 births
Welsh people of Scottish descent
Sportspeople from Bulawayo
Welsh footballers
Zimbabwean footballers
Association football midfielders
Wales under-21 international footballers
Wales international footballers
Premier League players
English Football League players
National League (English football) players
Brighton & Hove Albion F.C. players
Cardiff City F.C. players
Charlton Athletic F.C. players
Gillingham F.C. players
Lewes F.C. players
White Zimbabwean sportspeople
Zimbabwean expatriate footballers
Zimbabwean expatriate sportspeople in England
Expatriate footballers in England